Rye Beach may refer to:

United States
Rye Beach, New Hampshire, in Rockingham County
Rye Beach (New York), a small beach and resort area in Rye (city), New York, in Westchester County
Playland (New York), a historic amusement park that constitutes the primary development at Rye Beach

Australia
Rye Beach, Victoria, in the town of Rye, Victoria